Mühlbach is a comune (municipality) in South Tyrol in northern Italy, located about  northeast of Bolzano.

Geography

The municipality of Mühlbach contains the frazioni (subdivisions, mainly villages and hamlets) Meransen (Maranza), Spinges (Spinga), Vals (Valles).

Mühlbach borders the following municipalities: Freienfeld, Franzensfeste, Natz-Schabs, Rodeneck, Pfitsch, and Vintl.

History

Coat-of-arms
The emblem is crossed diagonally by an argent wavy stream on vert; at the top a water wheel and an argent donkey at bottom. The water wheel symbolizes the water mill once numerous in the area for the grinding; the donkey represents the pack animals used for the transport. The emblem was adopted in 1971.

Society

Linguistic distribution
According to the 2011 census, 95.34% of the population speak German, 3.93% Italian and 0.73% Ladin as first language.

Demographic evolution

References

External links
 Homepage of the municipality
Homepage of the Mühlbacher Close (Rio Pusteria Close)

Municipalities of South Tyrol